Merkury Vagin (Russian: Меркурий Вагин) (died 1712) was a Russian Arctic explorer.

In 1712, together with Yakov Permyakov, Vagin explored the region of the eastern Laptev Sea coast. His exploration included Bolshoy Lyakhovsky Island, the southernmost of the New Siberian Archipelago. With a group of Cossacks they crossed the Yana Bay over the ice from the mouth of the Yana River; after reaching Bolshoy Lyakhovsky, they explored the then-unknown island, which had been reported by Permyakov two years earlier.

Vagin and Permyakov were murdered on the return voyage by mutineering expedition members. The Cossacks took their dead bodies down to the ice and set them on fire. No one knows what the rebellious Cossacks did with the ashes, but Merkury Vagin's remains were never found. Merkuriya Island was later named after him.

References

1712 deaths
Russian murder victims
Russian explorers
Explorers of Asia
Explorers of the Arctic
New Siberian Islands
Laptev Sea
Year of birth unknown
Male murder victims
Russian Cossacks
Tsardom of Russia people